is a series of Japanese arcade game machines created by Bandai, which largely focus around the digital use of collectible trading cards. It is an expansion of Bandai's Carddass collectible trading card series, which allows players to use special cards to interact with arcade video games. Many of these machines revolve around various anime and tokusatsu franchises owned by Bandai. The machines first began release in Japanese arcades from March 2005.

Bandai had sold 100,000 Data Carddass arcade machines by March 2012. For use with the machines, over 2.4billion Data Cardass cards had been sold by 2017, increasing to  Data Carddass cards sold .

Overview
Data Carddass make use of special Carddass cards with data stored on them. These collectible cards can be read by various Data Carddass machines in order to interact with the game. For example, in Aikatsu!, a game revolving around fashion, players can scan cards featuring various clothes to make their character wear them. Depending on the machine, cards can either be inserted via a slot or scanned via a flat panel. Each machine is also fitted with various controls unique to their specific minigames, such as buttons which require timed presses or touches. Performing well in these games can also grant additional cards. Select machines utilise IC cards, which allow frequent players to save personal data from the games. Certain machines can also scan collectible toys to affect the gameplay.

Series
These machines are periodically updated as new elements are added in their respective franchises.

Ongoing series
 Official IC Card Support type
 Aikatsu! 2012年10月～
 Great Animal Kaiser 2012年7月～
 Daikaijuu Rush ULTRA FRONTIER 2013年9月～
 Kamen Rider Ganbarizing 2013年10月～

 No IC Card Support type
 Pretty Cure Princess Party 2015年4月～
 Ultraman Fusion Fight! 2016年7月～

Retired series
 Hyakujuu Taisen Animal Kaiser
 Dragon Ball series
 Data Carddass: Dragon Ball Z
 Data Carddass: Dragon Ball Z 2
 Dragon Ball Z: Bakuretsu Impact
 Dragon Ball Z: W Bakuretsu Impact
 Dragon Ball Kai Dragon Battlers
 Naruto series
 Naruto Narultimate Card Battle
 Naruto Shippuden: Kyuukyoku Ninmu Narultimate Mission
 Naruto Shippuden: Narultimate Cross
 Digimon series
 Kyuukyoku Taisen! Digimon Battle Terminal Kyuukyoku Taisen! Digimon Battle Terminal 02 Digimon Xros Wars Chou Digicard Taisen Digimon Xros Wars Chou Digicard Taisen: General Strikers Tamagotchi series
 Chou Nenju Kaisai Card de Ouen! Tamagotchi Cup All Seasons Saa Ikou! Card de Entry! Tamagotchi Contest Tamagotchi Fushigi na Ehon Card de Dechakushin! Tamagotchi! Card de Happy! Tamagotchi! Tama Heart Collection Daikaijuu Battle series:
 Daikaijuu Battle Ultra Monsters Daikaijuu Battle Ultra Monsters Ex Daikaijuu Battle Ultra Monsters Neo Daikaijuu Battle Ultra Monster Neo: Galaxy Legend Daikaijuu Battle RR Pretty Cure series
 Utatte! Pretty Cure Dream Live ~Speech Card de Metamorphose!? Pretty Cure All Stars: GoGo Dream Live Pretty Cure All Stars: Fresh Dream Dance Pretty Cure All Stars: HeartCatch Dream Dance One Piece series
 One Piece Berry Match One Piece Berry Match Double One Piece Berry Match Icy Super Sentai series
 Super Sentai Battle Dice-O Power Rangers series
 Power Rangers Card Battle''

References

External links
 Official website 

Arcade games
Arcade system boards
Digital collectible card games
Trading cards
Video games developed in Japan
Bandai games